Tarq may refer to:
 Taroq
 Tarq, Isfahan
 Toroq (disambiguation)